The Little Theatre of Jean Renoir is a 1970 television film written and directed by Jean Renoir. The last completed work by Renoir, it consists of three short films: The Last Christmas Dinner, The Electric Floor Waxer and A Tribute to Tolerance.

Cast
Le Dernier Réveillon
Nino Formicola as Le Clochard
Milly as La Clocharde
Roland Bertin as Gontran
André Dumas as Le Gérant
Robert Lombart as Le Maître d'hôtel
with
Frédéric Santaya, Gib Grossac, Pierre Gualdi, Annick Berger, Roger Trapp, Max Vialle
and
Jean-Michel Molé, Paulette Deveson, Tom Clark, Sabine Hermosa, G. Taillade, E. Braconnier, Daniel Sursain, Lolita Soler, Sébastien Floche, Alain Péron, Gilbert Caron, Bisciglia

La Cireuse électrique
Marguerite Cassan as Émilie
Pierre Olaf as Gustave, The Husband
Jacques Dynam as Jules
Jean-Louis Tristan as Le Réprésentant
Denis Gunzburg, Claude Guillaume as Les Amoureux

Quand l'amour meurt
Jeanne Moreau as La chanteuse (The Singer)

Le Roi d'Yvestot
Fernand Sardou as Duvallier
Jean Carmet as Feraud
and
Françoise Arnoul as Isabelle
with
Andrex as Monsieur Blanc
Roger Prégor as Maître July
Edmond Ardisson as César
and
Dominique Labourier as Paulette

External links

 

1970 films
1970 television films
French television films
Italian television films
West German films
German television films
1970s French-language films
1970 drama films
Films directed by Jean Renoir
Films scored by Joseph Kosma